Bahcesehir Koleji is a private school located in Turkey with 143 campuses. It was founded in 1994 by Enver Yucel. The school was founded with the mission of providing of the highest and most contemporary education, while always holding dear the principle of equality of opportunity began providing education at its site in the Istanbul suburb of Bahçeşehir.

History 
Bahçeşehir College was opened in 1994. The college expanded into Anatolia for the 2003-2004 academic year.

All schools that operate within the institutional structure of the Bahçeşehir College network follows the same standards. All aspects of the school ranging from the physical study environment of the school to the curriculum and system of instruction are maintained according to the same criteria. Teaching and management staff use the opportunities provided by Bahçeşehir University and its affiliated partner tertiary education institutions/universities overseas.

Bahçeşehir College became the first foreign school to be awarded the prestigious "Blue Ribbon Award for Educational Excellence" by the Schools of Excellence Association.

There are 42 kindergartens, 27 primary schools, 16 high schools and 4 science museums within its institutional framework.

Bahçeşehir High School for Science and Technology
The school is the first science and technology high school in Turkey, located in the Bahçeşehir district of Istanbul. The school was founded with the aim of producing scientifically literate graduates.

Students who have been selected by Bahçeşehir High School for Science and Technology for the past two years have been those applicants with the highest overall nationwide scores achieved on the national 'SBS' secondary school placement exam, sat by over a million students in Turkey at the end of their primary education.

Scholarships are provided by institutions, organisations and individuals to students who earn places at the school. These scholarships cover in full: the costs of tuition fees, lodging at school dormitories, school uniforms, school books and materials, a personal laptop computer per student and a pocket money allowance.

The aim of Bahçeşehir High School for Science and Technology is to ensure that students, having completed their high school education and achieved a ranking within the top 100 students in the Turkish national university selection examination (ÖSS) nationwide, will go on to obtain scholarships from universities such as Harvard, MIT or Stanford.

Science Museum on school grounds
With the aim of encouraging children, particularly the 12 to 15 age-group, and adults of all ages to enjoy science, the Bahçeşehir Science Museum has opened on the Bahçeşehir High School campus, with most of the installments designed and constructed by the students of the Bahçeşehir High School for Science and Technology. This was the first science museum of its kind to be established by a school, on its own school grounds  This science museum was followed by a second museum at BJK College in Istanbul and a third such project in the Karşıyaka district of Izmir.

After the opening of this series of science museums targeted at the preschool-teen age group, Turkey's first Children's Science Museum, aimed at interesting younger primary school children in science, opened at Bahçeşehir Primary School campus in April 2010 during the same week as the National Children's Day official holiday.

See also 
 Bahçeşehir University

References

External links
Bahcesehir K-12 schools

High schools in Istanbul
Private schools in Turkey
1994 establishments in Turkey
Educational institutions established in 1994